Joseph Nigg (13 October 1782 – 19 September 1863) was an Austrian painter, with painting on porcelain a specialty.

Born in Vienna, Nigg studied at the Academy of Fine Arts in Vienna with Johann Baptist Drechsler. From 1800 to 1843, Nigg worked as a flower painter in a Viennese porcelain factory. Beginning in 1835, this post also involved holding classes in painting at the factory. With the advent of the Biedermeier Era, flower painting became immensely popular and was also to be found on large porcelain plaques. A piece of this sort, thirty inches in height, was presented by Nigg, on behalf of the Viennese factory, at The Great Exhibition of 1851 in London.

In addition to working in porcelain, Nigg also created oil paintings, watercolors, and pastel drawings. Two of his paintings, "Grandmother's Bouquet I" and "Grandmother's Bouquet II" have found enduring popularity as poster and print reproductions. Nigg died in Vienna in 1863.

1782 births
1863 deaths
19th-century Austrian painters
19th-century Austrian male artists
Austrian male painters
Academy of Fine Arts Vienna alumni
Artists from Vienna
Flower artists
Porcelain painters